Benito Francisco Lopez (born 6 April 1994) is an American mixed martial artist. He most recently competed in the Bantamweight division of the Ultimate Fighting Championship (UFC).

Combat career

Mixed martial arts career

Early career 

In April 2014, Lopez won his debut MMA debut fight against Oscar Ramirez at Bellator 115 event at Reno, Nevada, United States.

Later in September, Lopez signed to WFC and won two MMA matches versus Drey Mitchell at the WFC 11 - Mitchell vs. Major event and against Matt Wagy at the WFC 13 - Huckaba vs. Mitchell event. In 2016 and the first half of the 2017, Lopez signed a multi-fight contract with the King of the Cage, winning all three fights against Rick James, Journey Newson and Benjamin Vinson, respectively.

After the fight against Steven Peterson at Dana White's Contender Series 7 , Lopez was awarded with UFC contract, together with Joby Sanchez.

Ultimate Fighting Championship 

On 9 December 2019, Lopez was scheduled to face Martin Day at UFC Fight Night: Swanson vs. Ortega. However Day pulled out of the event due to a knee injury and he was replaced by Albert Morales. He won his UFC debut fight via unanimous decision.

Lopez was scheduled to face Manny Bermudez on January 26, 2019 at UFC 233. As a result of the cancellation of UFC 233, the pair was rescheduled to UFC on ESPN: Ngannou vs. Velasquez on February 17, 2019. He lost the fight via guillotine choke submission in round one.

Lopez was scheduled to face Ricky Simon at UFC 227 on August 4, 2018. However, it was reported that Lopez pulled out from the bout for undisclosed reason and he was replaced by Montel Jackson.

Lopez faced Vince Morales on 13 July 2019 at UFC Fight Night: de Randamie vs. Ladd. He won the fight via unanimous decision.

After a three-year layoff, Lopez faced Mario Bautista on November 5, 2022 at UFC Fight Night 214. At the weigh-ins, Lopez weighed in at 138.5 pounds, two and a half pounds over the bantamweight non-title fight limit. Lopez will be fined 20% of this individual purse which will go to his opponent Bautista. He lost the fight via a reverse triangle armbar submission in the first round.

After the lost to Bautista, Lopez was released from UFC.

Mixed martial arts record

|-
|Loss
|align=center|10–2
|Mario Bautista
|Submission (reverse triangle armbar)
|UFC Fight Night: Rodriguez vs. Lemos
|
|align=center|1
|align=center|4:54
|Las Vegas, Nevada, United States
|
|-
|Win
|align=center|10–1
|Vince Morales
|Decision (unanimous)
|UFC Fight Night: de Randamie vs. Ladd
|
|align=center|3
|align=center|5:00
|Sacramento, California, United States
|
|-
|Loss
|align=center|9–1
|Manny Bermudez
|Submission (guillotine choke)
|UFC on ESPN: Ngannou vs. Velasquez
|
|align=center|1
|align=center|3:09
|Phoenix, Arizona, United States
|
|-
|Win
|align=center|9–0
|Albert Morales
|Decision (unanimous)
|UFC Fight Night: Swanson vs. Ortega
|
|align=center|3
|align=center|5:00
|Fresno, California, United States
|
|-
|Win
|align=center|8–0
|Steven Peterson
|Decision (split)
|Dana White's Contender Series 7 
|
|align=center|3
|align=center|5:00
|Las Vegas, Nevada, United States
| 
|-
|Win
|align=center|7–0
|Benjamin Vinson
|TKO (Doctor Stoppage)
|KOTC: Flashback
|
|align=center|1
|align=center|5:00
|Oroville, California, United States
| 
|-
|Win
|align=center|6–0
|Journey Newson
|KO (punches)
|KOTC: Unchallenged
|
|align=center|1
|align=center|3:04
|Oroville, California, United States
| 
|-
|Win
|align=center|5–0
|Rick James
|KO (punch)
|KOTC: Home Turf
|
|align=center|1
|align=center|0:08
|Oroville, California, United States
| 
|-
|Win
|align=center|4–0
|Stephone Taylor
|Submission (arm-triangle choke)
|IFC: Warriors Challenge 36
|
|align=center|1
|align=center|0:56
|Oroville, California, United States
| 
|-
|Win
|align=center|3–0
|Matt Wagy
|Submission (guillotine choke)
|WFC 13: Huckaba vs. Mitchell
|
|align=center|1
|align=center|0:48
|Sacramento, California, United States
|
|-
|Win
|align=center|2–0
|Drey Mitchell
|Decision (unanimous)
|WFC 11: Mitchell vs. Major
|
|align=center|3
|align=center|5:00
|Sacramento, California, United States
|
|-
|Win
|align=center|1–0
|Oscar Ramirez
|Decision (unanimous)
|Bellator 115 
|
|align=center|3
|align=center|5:00
|Reno, Nevada, United States
|

See also
List of male mixed martial artists

References

External links
 
 

1994 births
Living people
American male mixed martial artists
Sportspeople from Oroville, California
American male kickboxers
Bantamweight mixed martial artists
Ultimate Fighting Championship male fighters